The National Police Commissioner of Denmark is the head of the Rigspolitiet, responsible for all activities of the police.

List of officeholders

References 

 
Law enforcement in Denmark